Shi Guihong (born February 13, 1968) is a female Chinese football (soccer) player who competed in the 1996 Summer Olympics.

In 1996 she won the silver medal with the Chinese team. She played all five matches and scored two goals.

References

External links

profile

1968 births
Living people
Chinese women's footballers
Olympic footballers of China
Footballers at the 1996 Summer Olympics
Olympic silver medalists for China
1995 FIFA Women's World Cup players
Olympic medalists in football
Asian Games medalists in football
Footballers at the 1994 Asian Games
Medalists at the 1996 Summer Olympics
China women's international footballers
Asian Games gold medalists for China
Women's association footballers not categorized by position
Medalists at the 1994 Asian Games